In algebra, Weyl's theorem on complete reducibility is a fundamental result in the theory of Lie algebra representations (specifically in the representation theory of semisimple Lie algebras). Let  be a semisimple Lie algebra over a field of characteristic zero.

The enveloping algebra is semisimple 
Weyl's theorem implies (in fact is equivalent to) that the enveloping algebra of a finite-dimensional representation is a semisimple ring in the following way.

If  is semisimple, then A is semisimple. (Proof: Since A is a finite-dimensional algebra, it is an Artinian ring; in particular, the Jacobson radical J is nilpotent. If V is simple, then  implies that . In general, J kills each simple submodule of V; in particular, J kills V and so J is zero.) Conversely, if A is semisimple, then V is a semisimple A-module; i.e., semisimple as a -module. (Note that a module over a semisimple ring is semisimple since a module is a quotient of a free module and "semisimple" is preserved under the free and quotient constructions.)

Application: preservation of Jordan decomposition 
Here is a typical application.

Since  are polynomials in  then, we see . As noted above, A has zero Jacobson radical. Since , we see that  is a nilpotent element in the center of A. But, in general, a central nilpotent belongs to the Jacobson radical; hence,  and thus also . This proves the special case.

In general,  is semisimple (resp. nilpotent) when  is semisimple (resp. nilpotent). This immediately gives (i) and (ii).

Proofs

Analytic proof 
Weyl's original proof (for complex semisimple Lie algebras) was analytic in nature: it famously used the unitarian trick. Specifically, one can show that every complex semisimple Lie algebra  is the complexification of the Lie algebra of a simply connected compact Lie group . (If, for example, then .)

Algebraic proof 1
Let  be a finite-dimensional representation of a Lie algebra  over a field of characteristic zero. The theorem is an easy consequence of Whitehead's lemma, which says  is surjective, where a linear map  is a derivation if . The proof is essentially due to Whitehead.

Let  be a subrepresentation.
.
We then have ; that is to say  is -linear. Also, as t kills ,  is an idempotent such that .

See also Weibel's homological algebra book.

Algebraic proof 2 
Whitehead's lemma is typically proved by means of the quadratic Casimir element of the universal enveloping algebra, and there is also a proof of the theorem that uses the Casimir element directly instead of Whitehead's lemma.

A key point is to establish that  is nonzero whenever the representation is nontrivial.

Consider a very special case of the theorem on complete reducibility: the case where a representation  contains a nontrivial, irreducible, invariant subspace  of codimension one. It then easily follows that  must have a nonzero kernel—and the kernel is an invariant subspace, since  is a self-intertwiner.
.

Although this establishes only a very special case of the desired result, this step is actually the critical one in the general argument.

Algebraic proof 3 
The theorem can be deduced from the theory of Verma modules, which characterizes a simple module as a quotient of a Verma module by a maximal submodule. This approach has an advantage that it can be used to weaken the finite-dimensionality assumptions (on algebra and representation).

Let  be a finite-dimensional representation of a finite-dimensional semisimple Lie algebra  over an algebraically closed field of characteristic zero. Let  be the Borel subalgebra determined by a choice of a Cartan subalgebra and positive roots. Let . Then  is an -module and thus has the -weight space decomposition:

where . We claim: . Suppose . Now,  has weight . Since  is partially ordered, there is a  such that ; i.e., . But this is a contradiction since  are both primitive weights (it is known that the primitive weights are incomparable.). Similarly, each  is simple as a -module.

External links 
 A blog post by Akhil Mathew

References 

 
 
 Jacobson, Nathan, Lie algebras, Republication of the 1962 original. Dover Publications, Inc., New York, 1979. 

 
 

Lie algebras
Theorems in representation theory